Gohadpur (or Gohad Pur) is a town in Sialkot, Punjab, Pakistan. It lies 2 km from the Sialkot general bus station from the Sialkot Airport. It is situated at the conjunction of Airport Road and Head Marala Road. It connects the villages like Ghansarpur, Gandaiwali, Tibbi, and Kapoorwali to the mainstream.

Notable people

 Khawaja Muhammad Asif (Political Constituency)
Firdous Ashiq Awan, Ex Minister of Broadcast & Information , Current Constituency NA-66 (Sialkot-I).
Armaghan Subhani, member of the National Assembly of Pakistan

References

Cities and towns in Sialkot District